The Milne-Bush Ranch, on Rt. 1 in or near Roswell, New Mexico, was listed on the National Register of Historic Places in 1988.  The listing included two contributing buildings.  It has also been known as Ave de Paso.

The house started as a one-room adobe homestead around 1884 and was expanded over the years, through the 1920s. It includes "a fireplace and bookshelves hand-carved by artist B.J.O. Nordfeldt who was a member of the Santa Fe art colony from 1918 to 1940.

The barn was built between 1923 and 1926 when the property was used as a hunting lodge.  The barn is partly open to a corral.

The architecture is New Mexico vernacular.

References

Ranches in New Mexico
New Mexico vernacular architecture
National Register of Historic Places in Chaves County, New Mexico